Ceylalictus is a genus of bees belonging to the family Halictidae.

The genus has almost cosmopolitan distribution (except America).

Species:

Ceylalictus aldabranus 
Ceylalictus appendiculatus 
Ceylalictus borneanus 
Ceylalictus capverdensis 
Ceylalictus celebensis 
Ceylalictus cereus 
Ceylalictus congoensis 
Ceylalictus dapitanellus 
Ceylalictus desertorum 
Ceylalictus formosicola 
Ceylalictus grandior 
Ceylalictus hainanicus 
Ceylalictus halictoides 
Ceylalictus hedickei 
Ceylalictus horni 
Ceylalictus inornatus 
Ceylalictus karachensis 
Ceylalictus madagassus 
Ceylalictus malayensis 
Ceylalictus muiri 
Ceylalictus nanensis 
Ceylalictus obscurus 
Ceylalictus perditellus 
Ceylalictus petiolatus 
Ceylalictus punjabensis 
Ceylalictus rostratus 
Ceylalictus seistanicus 
Ceylalictus sylvestris 
Ceylalictus taprobanae 
Ceylalictus tumidus 
Ceylalictus valdezi 
Ceylalictus variegatus 
Ceylalictus warnckei

References

Halictidae
Hymenoptera genera